The River Leven is a perennial river for most of its length, located in the north-western region of Tasmania, Australia. It was named by the Van Diemen's Land Company after the River Leven in Scotland.

Location and features
The river rises in the Vale of Belvoir Conservation Area near Cradle Mountain, passes through Leven Canyon, and flows generally north into Bass Strait at Ulverstone. The river descends  over its  course.

See also

Notes

References

Leven
North West Tasmania